Global Energy Monitor (GEM) is a San Francisco-based non-governmental organization which catalogs fossil fuel and renewable energy projects worldwide. GEM shares information in support of clean energy and its data and reports on energy trends are widely cited by governments, media, and academic researchers.

History 
Global Energy Monitor was founded in 2007 by writer and environmentalist Ted Nace. Originally named "Coalswarm", and affiliated with Earth Island Institute, the organization created a tracker database of global coal-fired power stations that became "widely respected" by academic researchers, media outlets, and governments. In 2018, GEM became an independent organization and expanded coverage to include natural gas pipelines, steel plants, coal mines, oil and gas extraction sites and renewable energy infrastructures.

Research 
Global Energy Monitor produces information about energy infrastructures through datasets, maps, and online profiles of specific energy projects housed on its GEM.Wiki platform. The model has been commended for improving transparency and accuracy for climate governance.

GEM's data has several thousand users worldwide, including governments, international agencies, commercial and non profit organizations, academics, universities, and media outlets. This includes the Intergovernmental Panel on Climate Change, International Energy Agency, Rystad Energy, Oxfam, Sierra Club, Natural Resources Defense Council, Friends of the Earth, Greenpeace, Institute for Energy Economics and Financial Analysis (IEEFA), World Bank, International Monetary Fund, Mercator Research Center, Potsdam Institute for Climate Impact Research, Pembina Institute, Rocky Mountain Institute, Urgewald, World Wide Fund for Nature, Center for Research on Energy and Clean Air (CREA), and International Center for Climate Governance (ICCG), among others.

List of trackers 
 Global Coal Plant Tracker – Global Coal Plant Tracker documents existing, proposed, cancelled, and retired coal-fired power plants worldwide.
  Global Coal Mine Tracker -– Global Coal Mine Tracker documents existing, proposed, cancelled, and closed coal mines and projects worldwide.
 Global Coal Project Finance Tracker – Global Coal Finance Tracker surveys the financial institutions, both publicly and privately owned, that have provided funding for coal-fired power stations since 2010.
 Global Gas Infrastructure Tracker – Global Gas Infrastructure Tracker aggregates information on oil and gas projects such as pipelines and terminals.
 Global Oil Infrastructure Tracker
 Global Oil and Gas Extraction Tracker
 Global Coal Terminals Tracker
 Global Steel Plant Tracker
 Global Gas Plant Tracker
 Global Solar Power Tracker
 Global Wind Power Tracker
 Global Bioenergy Power Tracker
 Global Geothermal Power Tracker
 Europe Gas Tracker – Europe Gas Tracker is a comprehensive dataset of fossil gas infrastructure across the European Union.
 Asia Gas Tracker
 Africa Gas Tracker
 Portal Energético para América Latina

See also 
 350.org
 Climate Reality Project
 European Renewable Energy Council
 Greenpeace
 Climate TRACE

References

Further reading

Major reports 
 Boom and Bust (2020)
 Gambling On Gas: Risks Grow For Japan's $20 Billion LNG Financing Spree (2020)
 Gas Bubble 2020: Tracking Global LNG Infrastructure (2020)
 How Plans for New Coal Are Changing Around the World (2019)
 A Coal Phase-Out Pathway for 1.5 °C (2018)

Other reading

External links 
 
 Global Coal Plant Tracker
 Global Gas Plant Tracker
 Global Coal Mine Tracker
 Global Coal Finance Tracker 
 Global Oil Infrastructure Tracker
 Global Steel Plant Tracker
 Global Gas Infrastructure Tracker
 Europe Gas Tracker

Fossil fuels
Non-governmental organizations
Energy research institutes